Phil Marks (born 13 April 1961) is an Australian cricketer. He played thirteen first-class and seven List A matches for New South Wales between 1983/84 and 1989/90.

See also
 List of New South Wales representative cricketers

References

External links
 

1961 births
Living people
Australian cricketers
New South Wales cricketers
Sportspeople from Harare